Events from the year 1881 in art.

Events
 April – Sixth Impressionist exhibition in Paris, at Nadar's studio.
 August 31 – English painters Thomas Cooper Gotch and Caroline Burland Yates marry at Newlyn.
 The Société des Artistes Français is established, with William-Adolphe Bouguereau as its first president.
 Vincent van Gogh returns from study in Brussels to his parents' home in Etten (Netherlands) where he produces a number of early works, including the start of his series of peasant character studies and still lifes (including Still Life with Straw Hat).

 Art Gallery of South Australia established in Adelaide.
 St. Louis School and Museum of Fine Arts established at Washington University in St. Louis, Missouri, under the direction of Halsey Ives.
 Dante Gabriel Rossetti's Ballads and Sonnets published.

Works

 Lawrence Alma-Tadema
 In the Tepidarium
 Sappho and Alcaeus
 Marie Bashkirtseff – The Studio
 Jules Bastien-Lepage – Pauvre Fauvette
 Alfred Boucher – La Piété Filiale (sculpture)
 Frank Bramley – A Hopeless Dawn
 Lady Butler – Scotland Forever!
 Gustave Caillebotte - The Bezique Game (La partie de Bésigue)
 Paul Cézanne – Self-portrait with olive wallpaper
 Pierre Puvis de Chavannes – The Poor Fisherman (Musée d'Orsay, Paris)
 John Collier
 Charles Darwin
 Sir George Jessel
 Edgar Degas
 Little Dancer of Fourteen Years (sculpture)
 Trotting Horse (California Palace of the Legion of Honor, San Francisco)
 Stanhope Forbes – A Street in Brittany
 Aleksander Gierymski – Jewess with Oranges
 Atkinson Grimshaw – Shipping on the Clyde
 Ralph Hedley – John Graham Lough in His Studio
 Jean-Jacques Henner – Saint Jerome
 Max Klinger – Paraphrases about the Finding of a Glove (etchings, printed)
 Benjamin Williams Leader – February Fill Dyke
 Frederic Leighton
 Bianca
 Whispers
 Juan Luna – The Death of Cleopatra
 Édouard Manet
 Dead Eagle Owl
 Le Suicidé
 Luc-Olivier Merson – Nôtre-Dame de Paris
 Hendrik Willem Mesdag – Panorama Mesdag
 Claude Monet Waves Breaking
 Albert Joseph Moore
 Blossoms
 Yellow Marguerites
 Hjalmar Munsterhjelm – Woodland Pool by Moonlight
 Giovanni Muzzioli – In the Temple of Bacchus
 Jean-François Raffaëlli – Les déclassés (The Absinthe Drinkers)
 Vinnie Ream – Admiral David G. Farragut (bronze, Washington, D.C.)

 Pierre-Auguste Renoir
 Bay of Naples, Evening
 Blonde Bather (first version)
 Luncheon of the Boating Party
 Pink and Blue
 Ilya Repin
 Polina Strepetova as Lizaveta
 Portrait of Modest Petrovich Mussorgsky
 Dante Gabriel Rossetti – Found (work finished but never completed)
 Augustus Saint-Gaudens – Admiral David Glasgow Farragut (bronze, Manhattan)
 John Singer Sargent – Dr. Samuel Jean Pozzi at Home
 Henryk Siemiradzki – The Sword Dance
 William Stott of Oldham – Le Passeur ("The Ferry", Tate Britain)
 Henry Jones Thaddeus – La retour du bracconier (The Wounded Poacher)
 James Tissot – Goodbye, on the Mersey
 Viktor Vasnetsov
 Alenushka
 Three Tsarevnas of the Underground Kingdom
 James McNeill Whistler – Portrait of Lady Meux in two completed versions:
 Arrangement in Black, No. 5
 Harmony in Pink and Grey

Births
 January 4 – Wilhelm Lehmbruck, German sculptor (suicide 1919)
 January 5 – Pablo Gargallo, Aragonese painter and sculptor (died 1934)
 February 4 – Fernand Léger, French painter (died 1955)
 February 11
 Carlo Carrà, Italian painter (died 1966)
 Robert Borlase Smart, English painter and critic (died 1947)
 April 10 – William John Leech, Irish painter (died 1968)
 April 16 – Fortunino Matania, Italian-born illustrator and war artist (died 1963)
 July 12 – Natalia Goncharova, Russian theatrical costume and set designer, painter and illustrator (died 1962)
 July 28 – Léon Spilliaert, Belgian symbolist painter and graphic artist (died 1946)
 July 29 – Jessie Traill, Australian printmaker (died 1967)
 August 4 – Wenzel Hablik, Bohemian painter, graphic artist, designer (died 1934)
 October 4 - René Gimpel, French artbdealer (died 1945)
 October 25 – Pablo Picasso, Spanish painter, draughtsman and sculptor (died 1973)
 December 8 – Albert Gleizes, French painter (died 1953)
 December 31 – Max Pechstein, German painter (died 1955)
 uncertain
 William Conor, Irish painter (died 1968)
 Nazmi Ziya Güran, Turkish painter (died 1937)

Deaths
 January 3 – Anna McNeill Whistler, "Whistler's Mother" (born 1804)
 January 24 – James Collinson, English Pre-Raphaelite painter (born 1825)
 February 9 – Jacques-Édouard Gatteaux, French sculptor and medal engraver (born 1788)
 March 11 – Thomas Brigstocke, Welsh portrait painter (born 1809)
 May 24 – Samuel Palmer, English painter, etcher and lithographer (born 1805)
 July 25 – Edward Charles Williams, English landscape painter (born 1807)
 December 6 – Thomas Skinner, English etcher (poisoned; born 1819)
 December 13 – John Quidor, American painter (born 1801)
 December 14 – Berndt Godenhjelm, Finnish painter (born 1799)
 December 21 - Francesco Hayez, Italian historical, portrait and political painter (born 1791)

References

 
Years of the 19th century in art
1880s in art